Slivnica or Slivnitsa may refer to 

Bulgaria
Slivnitsa, a town in western Bulgaria
 Battle of Slivnitsa, 1885

Croatia
Slivnica, Croatia, a settlement in the Municipality of Zadar

North Macedonia
Slivnica, Resen

Serbia
Slivnica (Dimitrovgrad)
Slivnica (Vranje)

Slovenia
Slivnica pri Mariboru, a settlement in the Municipality of Hoče-Slivnica
Slivnica pri Celju, a village in the Municipality of Šentjur
Slivnica (mountain), near Cerknica, Inner Carniola
Spodnja Slivnica, a settlement in the Municipality of Grosuplje
Zgornja Slivnica, a settlement in the Municipality of Grosuplje